Communities of various religious and ethnic background have lived in the land of what is now Afghanistan. Before the Islamic conquest, south of the Hindu Kush was ruled by the Zunbil and Kabul Shahi rulers. When the Chinese travellers (Faxian, Song Yun, Xuanzang, Wang-hiuon-tso, Huan-Tchao, and Wou-Kong) visited Afghanistan between 399 and 751 AD, they mentioned that Hinduism and Buddhism was practiced in different areas between the Amu Darya (Oxus River) in the north and the Indus River in the south. The land was ruled by the Kushans followed by the Hephthalites during these visits. It is reported that the Hephthalites were fervent followers of the Hindu god Surya.

The invading Muslim Arabs introduced Islam to a Zunbil king of Zamindawar (Helmand Province) in 653-4 AD, then they took the same message to Kabul before returning to their already Islamized city of Zaranj in the west. It is unknown how many accepted the new religion but the Shahi rulers remained non-Muslim until they lost Kabul in 870 AD to the Saffarid Muslims of Zaranj. Later, the Samanids from Bukhara in the north extended their Islamic influence into the area. It is reported that Muslims and non-Muslims still lived side by side in Kabul before the arrival of Ghaznavids from Ghazni.

The first mention of a Hindu in Afghanistan appears in the 982 AD Ḥudūd al-ʿĀlam, where it speaks of a king in "Ninhar" (Nangarhar), who shows a public display of conversion to Islam, even though he had over 30 wives, which are described as "Muslim, Afghan, and Hindu" wives. These names were often used as geographical terms by the Arabs. For example, Hindu (or Hindustani) has been historically used as a geographical term to describe someone who was native from the region known as India, and Afghan as someone who was native from a region called Bactria.

Archeology

Table of pre-Islamic dynasties of Afghanistan

Islamic conquest of Afghanistan

The region around Herat Province became Islamized in 642 AD, during the end of Muslim conquest of Persia. In 653-4 AD, General Abdur Rahman bin Samara arrived from Zaranj to the Zunbil capital Zamindawar with an army of around 6,000 Arab Muslims. The General "broke off a hand of the idol and plucked out the rubies which were its eyes in order to persuade the Marzbān of Sīstān of the god's worthlessness." He explained to the worshippers of the solar deity, "my intention was to show you that this idol can do neither any harm nor good." The people of southern Afghanistan began accepting Islam from this date onward. The Arabs then proceeded to Ghazni and Kabul to convert or conquer the Buddhist Shahi rulers. However, most historians claim that the rulers of Ghazni and Kabul remained non-Muslim. There is no information on the number of converts although the Arabs unsuccessfully continued their missions of invading the land to spread Islam for the next 200 or so years. It was in 870 AD when Ya'qub ibn al-Layth al-Saffar finally conquered Afghanistan by establishing Muslim governors throughout the provinces.

By the 11th century, when the Ghaznavids were in power, the entire population of Afghanistan was practicing Islam, except the Kafiristan region (Nuristan Province) which became Muslim in the late 1800s.

See also

 Gandharan Buddhism
 Gandhāran Buddhist texts
 Ancient history of Afghanistan
 Pre-Islamic scripts in Afghanistan
 Buddhism in Afghanistan
 Hinduism in Afghanistan
 Buddhas of Bamiyan
 Kandahar Greek Edicts of Ashoka
 Kandahar Bilingual Rock Inscription
 Gandhara Kingdom
 Nava Vihara
 Zabulistan
 Decline of Buddhism in the Indian subcontinent

References

External links
 Professor Abdul Hai Habibi See article The Cultural, Social And Intellectual State Of The People Of Afghanistan In The Era Just Before The Advent Of Islam by eminent Afghan historian Abdul Hai Habibi
 Shahi Coins in the Standard Catalog of World Coins 1901-2000 By Colin R. Bruce, Thomas Michael Page 35''
 Afghan caves contain world's first oil paintings
 Buddhist Sites in Afghanistan and Central Asia

Ancient history of Afghanistan
Archaeological sites in Afghanistan
Hinduism in Afghanistan
Buddhism in Afghanistan
Hinduism in South Asia
History of religion in Afghanistan